is a railway station in Suruga-ku, Shizuoka, Shizuoka Prefecture, Japan, operated by the private railway company, Shizuoka Railway (Shizutetsu).

Lines
Irieoka Station is a station on the Shizuoka–Shimizu Line and is 10.3 kilometers from the starting point of the line at Shin-Shizuoka Station.

Station layout
The station has a single island platform. The station building is built on one end of the platform, and has an automated ticket machine and turnstile, which accept the LuLuCa smart card ticketing system as well as the PiTaPa and ICOCA IC cards. As the only access to the station is via stairs, the station is not wheelchair accessible.

Platforms

Adjacent stations

Station History
It was renamed to its present name in 1934

Passenger statistics
In fiscal 2017, the station was used by an average of 372 passengers daily (boarding passengers only).

Surrounding area
Hamada Elementary School

See also
 List of railway stations in Japan

References

External links

 Shizuoka Railway official website 

Railway stations in Shizuoka Prefecture
Railway stations in Japan opened in 1908
Railway stations in Shizuoka (city)